Acraea asema, the speckled orange acraea, is a butterfly in the family Nymphalidae which is native to the southern subtropics of Africa.

Range
It is found in Angola, Zimbabwe, central and south-eastern Zambia, Malawi, Mozambique and southern Tanzania.

Description

A. asema Hew. (55 a) is very similar to the preceding species,[  A. violarum ]  but on an average somewhat smaller, 36-52 mm., with duller, more grey-yellow ground-colour and smaller black dots, the submarginal dots of the forewing in particular being smaller and rarely all present. Angola, Manicaland, Mashonaland and Nyassaland.
 f. gracilis Wichgr. [now forma of Acraea violarum] only differs in having the marginal band of the hindwing narrow, 1 mm. in breadth. Mashonaland.

Biology
The habitat consists of dry deciduous woodland.

Adults are on wing year round.

The larvae feed on Tricliceras species.

Taxonomy
It is a member of the Acraea cepheus species group.

References

External links

Die Gross-Schmetterlinge der Erde 13: Die Afrikanischen Tagfalter. Plate XIII 55 a
Acraea asema Le Site des Acraea de Dominique Bernaud
Acraea asema Image collection Dominique Bernaud
Images representing Acraea asema at Bold

Butterflies described in 1877
asema
Butterflies of Africa
Taxa named by William Chapman Hewitson